Inez Beijer (born 22 November 1995) is a Dutch professional racing cyclist, who currently rides for UCI Women's Continental Team .

References

External links

1995 births
Living people
Dutch female cyclists
Place of birth missing (living people)
20th-century Dutch women
20th-century Dutch people
21st-century Dutch women